Fiji participated in the 2010 Summer Youth Olympics in Singapore.

The Fijian squad consisted of five athletes competing in four sports: aquatics (swimming), athletics, judo and weightlifting.

Medalists

Athletics

Boys
Track and road events

Judo

Individual

Team

Swimming

Weightlifting

References

External links
Competitors List: Fiji

Nations at the 2010 Summer Youth Olympics
2010 in Fijian sport
Fiji at the Youth Olympics